Moritz Pasch (8 November 1843, Breslau, Prussia (now Wrocław, Poland) – 20 September 1930, Bad Homburg, Germany) was a German mathematician of Jewish ancestry specializing in the foundations of geometry. He completed his Ph.D. at the University of Breslau at only 22 years of age. He taught at the University of Giessen, where he is known to have supervised 30 doctorates.

In 1882, Pasch published a book, Vorlesungen über neuere Geometrie, calling for the grounding of Euclidean geometry in more precise primitive notions and axioms, and for greater care in the deductive methods employed to develop the subject. He drew attention to a number of heretofore unnoted tacit assumptions in Euclid's Elements. He then argued that mathematical reasoning should not invoke the physical interpretation of the primitive terms, but should instead rely solely on formal manipulations justified by axioms. This book is the point of departure for:
Similarly concerned Italians: Peano, Mario Pieri, Alessandro Padoa
Hilbert's work on geometry and mathematical axiomatics in general;
All modern thinking about the foundations of Euclidean geometry.

Pasch is perhaps best remembered for Pasch's axiom:

Given three noncollinear points a, b, c and a line X not containing any of these points, if X includes a point between a and b, then X also includes one and only one of the following: a point between a and c, or a point between b and c.

In other words, if a line crosses one side of a triangle, that line must also cross one of the two remaining sides of the same triangle.

Selected publications
 Vorlesungen über neuere Geometrie, Leipzig 1882; 
 Einleitung in die Differential- und Integralrechnung, Leipzig 1882
 Grundlagen der Analysis, Leipzig, 1908
 Mathematik und Logik, Leipzig, 1919
  Die Begriffsswelt des Mathematikers in der Vorhalll der Geometrie, Leipzig, 1922

Translations

See also
Pasch's theorem
Pasch hypergraph
Ordered geometry

References

External links
 
 The Mathematics Genealogy Project: Pasch.

1843 births
1930 deaths
19th-century German Jews
19th-century German mathematicians
Geometers
20th-century German mathematicians